The Cornelius C. Beekman House is a historic structure in Jacksonville, Oregon, United States. The house was constructed between 1870 and 1876, and the Oregon Historic Preservation Office, part of the Oregon Parks and Recreation Department, places the year closer to 1873. Part of "millionaires' row" in the Jacksonville Historic District, the house was built by banker Cornelius C. Beekman as a residence for his wife and children, and the Beekman family were the only recorded occupants.

The house is a museum owned by the City of Jacksonville, Oregon, and offers meeting and event facilities.

References

Gothic Revival architecture in Oregon
Houses completed in 1873
Houses in Jackson County, Oregon
1873 establishments in Oregon
Jacksonville, Oregon